The following is a list of Filipino singers.

A

Dong Abay
Bayani Agbayani
Joey Albert
Barbie Almalbis
Amapola
Cynthia Alexander
Freddie Aguilar
Hajji Alejandro
Rachel Alejandro
Joey Ayala
Kyline Alcantara
Ogie Alcasid
Morissette Amon
Charlott Jean Anore
Dely Atay-Atayan
Dingdong Avanzado
Michelle Ayalde

B

Carol Banawa
Edward Barber
Bayang Barrios
Carlos Balcells
Bassilyo
Heber Bartolome
Jimmy Bondoc
Jovit Baldivino
Christian Bautista
Beabadoobee
Zild Benitez
Mark Bautista
Janine Berdin
Blakdyak
Rico Blanco
Alisah Bonaobra
Andrea Brillantes
Ely Buendia

C

Noel Cabangon
Lito Camo
Ryan Cayabyab
Billy Crawford
John Cadeliña
Jose Mari Chan
Kim Chiu
Kean Cipriano
Sam Concepcion
Pilita Corrales
Teddy Corpuz
Roel Cortez
Yeng Constantino
Donna Cruz
Radha Cuadrado
 MEGASTAR Sharon Cuneta, the icon of divas
Anne Curtis

D

Claire de la Fuente
Dianne dela Fuente
Dingdong Dantes
JM de Guzman
Klarisse de Guzman
Mrld
Moira Dela Torre
Joey de Leon
Kisses Delavin
Enchong Dee
Lourd de Veyra
Francine Diaz
Elaine Duran
Jason Dy

E

Andrew E.
Kyle Echarri
Maymay Entrata
Eurika
Bituin Escalante
Darren Espanto
Brenan Espartinez
Karla Estrada
Heart Evangelista

F

Seth Fedelin
Pops Fernandez
Juris Fernandez
Florante
Rose Fostanes

G

Vice Ganda
Maricris Garcia
Tootsie Guevara
Janno Gibbs
Enrique Gil
Nikki Gil
Rachelle Ann Go
Sarah Geronimo
King Girado
Alex Gonzaga
Toni Gonzaga
Gary Granada
Catriona Gray

H

Mike Hanopol
Solenn Heussaff

Horey P. Gales

I

Agot Isidro

J

Ramon Jacinto
Jaya
RJ Jimenez
Jugs Jugueta
Jemay Santiago

K

Karylle
Kyla
Yasmien Kurdi

L

Juan Karlos Labajo
Raymond Lauchengco
Kris Lawrence
Kuh Ledesma
Ronnie Liang
Xian Lim
Nadine Lustre

M

Chito Miranda
Jed Madela
Elmo Magalona
Francis Magalona
Bamboo Manalac
Jennylyn Mercado
Gian Magdangal
Jolina Magdangal
Coco Martin
Maine Mendoza
Sam Milby
Lani Misalucha
Vina Morales

N

Kitchie Nadal
Roselle Nava
Sitti Navarro
Vhong Navarro
Arthur Nery
Martin Nievera
Nina
Grace Nono

O

Paolo Onesa
Daryl Ong
Doc. Willie Ong

Olivia Rodrigo

P

Daniel Padilla
Kylie Padilla
Zsa Zsa Padilla
Manny Pacquiao
Inigo Pascual
Piolo Pascual
Jett Pangan
Imelda Papin
Eddie Peregrina
Arnel Pineda
Lovi Poe
Pokwang
Marcelito Pomoy
Richard Poon
Yassi Pressman
Rico J. Puno
Myk Perez

Q

Angeline Quinto
Zia Quizon

R

Jay R
Myrus Ramirez
Khalil Ramos
April Boy Regino
Sheryn Regis
James Reid
Willie Revillame
Manilyn Reynes
Alden Richards
Ariel Rivera
Jamie Rivera
Marian Rivera
Wilbert Ross

S

Lea Salonga
Unique
Janella Salvador
Maja Salvador
Sampaguita
Julie Anne San Jose
Josh Santana
Randy Santiago
Aicelle Santos
Erik Santos
Gerald Santos
Judy Ann Santos
Vehnee Saturno
Aiza Seguerra
Vic Sotto
Marco Sison
Jay-R Siaboc
Pepe Smith

T

KZ Tandingan

U

V

Michael V
Regine Velasquez
Nikki Valdez
Gary Valenciano
Rey Valera
Viktoria
Ivy Violan
Jessica Villarubin
Yoyoy Villame
Cris Villonco
Jona Viray

W

Victor Wood

X

Y

Richard Yap
Mitoy Yonting

Z

Jake Zyrus
Jessa Zaragoza

See also

 List of singer-songwriters
 Lists of musicians
 List of Filipino composers

Filipino singers
Singers
Filipino